Hopkinsville Community College (HCC) is a public community college in Hopkinsville, Kentucky. It is one of 16 two-year, open-admissions colleges of the Kentucky Community and Technical College System (KCTCS). Founded in 1965, HCC maintains a main campus in Hopkinsville and an off-site campus on the Fort Campbell Army base. HCC is accredited by the Southern Association of Colleges and Schools (SACS). It offers Associate in Science and Associate in Applied Science degrees.

References

External links
Official website

Buildings and structures in Christian County, Kentucky
Kentucky Community and Technical College System
Educational institutions established in 1965
Universities and colleges accredited by the Southern Association of Colleges and Schools
Education in Christian County, Kentucky
1965 establishments in Kentucky
Hopkinsville, Kentucky